Technological University, Meiktila is located on the right side of Meiktila-Pindale Road in Meiktila, Mandalay Region. Its area is 51.65 acres.

The University was transferred to the present site in 2008. The former University was in Tawma Village-tract east of Meiktila. It was originally formed on 1 December 1986 as Government Technical Institute (Meiktila) in Tawma Village near Meiktila. It became Government Technological College on 25 November 1999. The University was inaugurated on 20 January 2007 at that place.

Departments
Technological University (Meikhtila) has the following departments:

Civil Engineering Department (C)
Electronics Engineering Department (EcE)
Electrical Power Engineering Department (EP)
Mechanical Engineering Department (ME)
Information Technology Department (IT)
Mechatronics Engineering Department (McE)

Programs
Technological University (Meikhtila) offers Graduate Degree Program and Under Graduate Degree Program.

LAB
Technological University (Meikhtila) provides laboratories for every major courses. Students in every engineering courses learn both in theoretical and practical for their courses.

See also
Mandalay Technological University
Technological University, Mandalay
Technological University, Kyaukse
Technological University Yamethin
University of Technology, Yadanabon Cyber City
List of Technological Universities in Myanmar

External links

Technological universities in Myanmar
Universities and colleges in Mandalay Region